Boxing Day is a 2012 British film directed by Bernard Rose. The film is roughly based on the 1895 Leo Tolstoy short story "Master and Man".

The film premiered at the 2012 Venice Film Festival.

Plot
An arrogant real estate developer named Basil and his unreliable hired chauffeur Nick battle the elements during a Boxing Day blizzard in Denver, Colorado.

Cast
Danny Huston as Basil
Matthew Jacobs as Nick
Edie Dakota as Waitress
Lisa Enos as Marianne
Jo Farkas as Church Lady
Julie Marcus as Cynthia (voice)
Dave Pressler as Banker
Morgan Walsh

References

External links

2012 films
2012 drama films
British drama films
Films based on works by Leo Tolstoy
Films based on short fiction
Films set in Colorado
2010s English-language films
2010s British films